Myron Waldman (April 23, 1908 – February 4, 2006) was an American animator, best known for his work at Fleischer Studios.

Early life
Waldman was born in Brooklyn, New York on April 23, 1908.  He was a graduate of the Pratt Institute, where he majored in Art.

Career
Waldman started his first work in 1930 at Fleischer Studio.  At Fleischer he worked on Betty Boop, Raggedy Ann, Gulliver's Travels, the animated adaptations of Superman, and Popeye.  He was head animator on two Academy Award-nominated shorts, Educated Fish (1937) and Hunky and Spunky (1939).

Waldman made the transition when Fleischer Studios was acquired by Paramount Pictures and reorganized as Famous Studios in 1942.  At Famous he worked mostly on the Casper the Friendly Ghost series.

Waldman  served three years in the U.S. Army (1939-1942).

In 1943, Waldman partnered with writer Steve Carlin to produce the Happy the Humbug comic strip.

In 1943, his wordless novel, one of the first, Eve: A Pictorial Love Story was a critical success.

In 1957, he left Famous to become an animation director at Hal Seeger Productions where he worked on the revival of the Out of the Inkwell series, as well as Milton the Monster, until his retirement in 1968.

In 1986 Waldman received the Motion Picture Screen Cartoonists Award, and in 1997 was given the Winsor McCay Award for his lifetime work in the field of animation.

Waldman made limited edition cel, drawing characters on which he worked, Betty Boop, Popeye and Superman.

Personal life
Waldman met his wife, Rosalie, when she was an animation checker at the Fleischer Studio in the early 1940s, and had two sons, Robert and Steve. Waldman died of congestive heart failure on February 4, 2006, at the age of 97 at a hospital in Bethpage, New York.

Filmography (As head animator) 
 1961: Cape Kidnaveral
 1960: The Planet Mouseola with Jack Ehret
 1958: Spook and Span with Wm.B. Pattengill
 1957: Ice Scream with Nick Tafuri
 1957: Ghost of Honor with Nick Tafuri
 1957: Peakaboo with Nick Tafuri
 1957: Hooky Spooky with Nick Tafuri
 1957: Spooking About Africa with Nick Tafuri
 1956: Line of Screammage with Nick Tafuri
 1956: Dutch Treat with Nick Tafuri
 1955: Red White and Boo with Nick Tafuri
 1955: Bull Fright with Nick Tafuri
 1955: Spooking with a Brouge with Nick Tafuri
 1955: Keep Your Grin Up with Nick Tafuri
 1955: Hide and Shriek with Nick Tafuri
 1954: Boo Ribbon Winner with Nick Tafuri
 1954: Boos and Arrows with Nick Tafuri
 1954: The Oily Bird with Gordon Whittier
 1954: Puss 'n Boos with Nick Tafuri 
 1954: Zero the Hero with Larry Silverman
 1954: Boo Moon with Nick Tafuri, Larry Silverman, Gordon Whittier
 1953: Boos and Saddles with Larry Silverman
 1953: Do or Diet with Nick Tafuri
 1953: Little Boo Peep with Larry Silverman
 1953: Herman the Catoonist with Larry Silverman
 1953: By the Old Mill Scream with Nick Tafuri 
 1953: Winner by a Hare with Tom Golden
 1953: Spook No Evil with Nick Tafuri
 1953: Frightday the Thirteenth with Larry Silverman
 1952: Feast and Furious with Gordon Whittier
 1952: Forest Fantasy with Larry Silverman
 1952: Cape Fright with Nick Tafuri
 1952: Spunky Skunky with Larry Silverman
 1954: Dizzy Dinosaurs with Gordon Whittier
 1952: The Deep Boo Sea with Nick Tafuri
 1951: Casper takes a Bow-Wow with Larry Silverman
 1951: Vegetable Vaudeville with Nick Tafuri
 1951: Casper Comes to Clown with Gordon Whittier, Larry Silverman
 1951: Boo Scout with Nick Tafuri
 1951: Too Boo or Not to Boo with Larry Silverman
 1951: Miners Forty-Niners with Larry Silverman
 1951: Mississippi River with Gordon Whittier
 1950: Once Upon a Rhyme with Larry Silverman
 1950: Fresh Yeggs with Nick Tafuri
 1950: Fiesta Time with Larry Silverman
 1950: Boos in the Nite with Nick Tafuri
 1950: Pleased to Eat You with Wm.B. Pattengill
 1950: Teacher's Pest with Gordon Whittier
 1950: The Land of the Lost Jewels with Gordon Whittier
 1949: Snow Foolin with Gordon Whittier
 1949: The Big Drip with Nick Tafuri
 1949: Strolling Thru the Park with Larry Silverman
 1949: For Me and My Gal with Gordon Whittier
 1949: Toys Will Be Toys with Gordon Whittier
 1949: Spring Song with Larry Silverman
 1949: A Haunting We Will Go with Irving Dressler
 1949: ''The Little Cut-Up with George Whittier
 1948: The Land of the Lost with Nick Tafuri
 1948: There's Good Boos Tonight with Morey Reden, Nick Tafuri
 1948: Flip Flap with Wm.B. Pattengill
 1948: The Dog Show-Off with Gordon Whittier, Nick Tafuri, Irving Dressler, and Wm.B. Pattengill
 1947: Santa's Surprise with Wm.B. Pattengill
 1947: A Bout with a Trout with Gordon Whittier, Nick Tafuri, Irving Dressler, Wm.B. Pattengill
 1947: Loose in a Caboose with Gordon Whittier, Nick Tafuri, Irving Dressler, Wm.B. Pattengill
 1947: Musica-Lulu with Gordon Whittier, Nick Tafuri, Irving Dressler
 1943: The Mummy Strikes with Graham Place
 1942: Japoteurs with Nick Tafuri
 1942: The Magnetic Telescope with Tom Moore
 1942: Billion Dollar Limited with Frank Endres
 1941: Mr. Bug Goes to Town (sequence director)
 1941: Twinkletoes in Hat Stuff with Sam Stimson
 1941: Twinkletoes in Hat Stuff with Sam Stimson
 1941: Copy Cat with William Henning
 1941: Popeye Meets Rip Van Winkle with Sidney Pillet
 1941: Raggedy Ann and Andy with Joe Oriolo, William Henning, Arnold Gillespie
 1941: Problem Pappy with Sidney Pillet
 1940: Springtime in the Rockage with Dick Williams
 1940: You Can't Shoe a Horsefly with Sam Stimson
 1940: Ants in the Plants with George Moreno
 1939: Rhythm on the Reservation with Graham Place
 1939: The Barnyard Brat with Tony Pabian
 1938: The Playful Polar Bears with Graham Place
 1938: All's Fair at the Fair with Graham Place
 1938: Hunky and Spunky with Graham Place
 1938: The Lost Kitten with Lillian Friedman
 1938: Honest Love and True with Lillian Friedman
 1938: Riding the Rail with Hicks Lokey
 1937: Educated Fish with Hicks Lokey
 1937: The New Deal Show with Hicks Lokey
 1937: The Candid Cancidate with Lillian Friedman
 1937: Peeping Penguins with Hicks Lokey
 1937: Pudgy Picks a Fight! with Hicks Lokey
 1937: Pudgy Takes a Bow-Wow with Lillian Friedman
 1937: Bunny Mooning with Edward Nolan
 1936: Making Friends with Hicks Lokey
 1936: Be Human with Lillian Friedman
 1936: Training Pigeons with Edward Nolan
 1936: Hawaiian Birds with Sam Stimson
 1936: You're Not Built that Way with Hicks Lokey
 1936: Betty Boop and Little Jimmy with Hicks Lokey
 1936: Not Now with Hicks Lokey
 1936: Betty Boop and the Little King with Hicks Lokey
 1935: Henry the Funniest Living American with Sam Stimson
 1935: Making Stars with Edward Nolan
 1935: No! No! A Thousand Times No!! with Edward Nolan
 1935: Stop that Noise with Edward Nolan
 1935: Taking the Blame with Hicks Lokey
 1935: A Little Soap and Water with Edward Nolan
 1935: A Language All My Own with Hicks Lokey
 1935: Judge for a Day with Hicks Lokey
 1935: Baby Be Good with Edward Nolan
 1934: When My Ship Comes In with Hicks Lokey
 1934: Keep in Style with Edward Nolan
 1934: Betty Boop's Prize Show with Lillian Friedman
 1934: Betty Boop's Little Pal with Edward Nolan
 1934: There's Something about a Soldier with Edward Nolan
 1934: Love thy Neighbor with Edward Nolan
 1934: Betty Boop's Trial with Hicks Lokey  
 1934: This Little Piggie Went to Market (uncredited)
 1934: Can You Take It? with Tom Johnson  
 1934: Let's All Sing Like the Birdies Sing with Tom Johnson

Filmography (As animator) 
 1985: See & Sing: Christmas Favorites
 1985: See & Sing: Songs of America
 1985: See & Sing: Silly Songs
 1985: See & Sing: All-Time Favorites
 1967: Batfink – This is Your Life
 1967: Father Time Bomb
 1967: Ego A-Go-Go
 1967: Blankenstein
 1967: The Copycat Bat
 1967: Unhappy Birthday
 1967: Hugo the Crimefighter
 1967: Double Double Crossers
 1967: Backwards Box
 1967: Robber Hood
 1967: The Kangarobot
 1967: Topsy Turvy
 1967: The Beep Booper
 1967: Goldstinger
 1967: Take Indian Taker
 1967: The Mark of Zero
 1967: Spin the Batfink
 1967: A Living Doll
 1967: Go Fly a Bat
 1967: Myron the Magician
 1967: The Dirty Stinker
 1967: Nuts of the Round Table
 1967: The Sonic Boomer
 1967: Ebenezer the Freezer
 1966: The Short Circuit Case
 1963: Boy Pest With Osh
 1939: Gulliver's Travels (uncredited)
 1933: Betty Boop's Hallowe'en Party with Willard Bowsky
 1933: I Like Mountain Music with Willard Bowsky
 1933: I Heard with Willard Bowsky
 1933: Boilesk with Willard Bowsky
 1933: Betty Boop's Birthday Party with Seymour Kneitel
 1933: Popular Melodies with Willard Bowsky
 1932: Sing a Song  with Seymour Kneitel
 1932: Wait Till the Sun Shines, Nellie with Seymour Kneitel
 1931: By the Light of the Silvery Moon with Seymour Kneitel

Filmography (As self) 

 1995: Betty Boop: Queen of the Cartoons A&E Biography
 2008: Directing the Sailor: The Art of Myron Waldman (7:21)

References

Works cited

External links

1908 births
2006 deaths
20th-century American Jews
Animators from New York (state)
Artists from Brooklyn
Pratt Institute alumni
Fleischer Studios people
Famous Studios people
21st-century American Jews